Witold Mieczysław Bałażak (born 15 November 1964 in Radom) is a Polish politician. He was elected to the Sejm on 25 September 2005, gaining 6,420 votes in 17 Radom district as a candidate from the League of Polish Families list.

Since 10 October 2009, Bałażak has been the chairman of the League of Polish Families.

See also
Members of Polish Sejm 2005-2007

External links
Witold Bałażak - parliamentary page - includes declarations of interest, voting record, and transcripts of speeches.

1964 births
Living people
People from Radom
Members of the Polish Sejm 2005–2007
League of Polish Families politicians